The global atmospheric electrical circuit is the continuous movement of atmospheric electricity between the ionosphere and the Earth. Through the balance of thunderstorms and fair weather, the atmosphere is subject to a continual and substantial electrical current.

Principally, thunderstorms throughout the world carry negative charges to the earth, which is then discharged gradually through the air in fair weather.

This atmospheric circuit is central to the study of atmospheric physics and meteorology. It is used in the understanding of atmospheric electricity across the planet. In the past it has been suggested as a source of available energy, or communications platform.

The global electrical circuit is also relevant to the study of human health and air pollution, due to the interaction of negative ions and aerosols. The effect of global warming, and temperature-sensitivity of the Earth's electrical circuit is unknown.

History 

The history of the global atmospheric electrical circuit is intertwined with the history of atmospheric electricity. For example, in the 18th century, scientists began understanding the link between lightning and electricity. In addition to the iconic kite experiments of Benjamin Franklin and Thomas-François Dalibard, some early studies of charge in a "cloudless atmosphere" (i.e. fair weather) were carried out by Giambatista Beccaria, John Canton, Louis-Guillaume Le Monnier and John Read.

Fair weather measurements from the late 18th century onwards often found consistent diurnal variations. During the 19th century, several long series of observations were made. Measurements near cities were (and still are) heavily influenced by smoke pollution. In the early 20th century, balloon ascents provided information about the electric field well above the surface. Important work was done by the research vessel Carnegie, which produced standardised measurements around the world's oceans (where the air is relatively clean).

C. T. R. Wilson was the first to present the concept of a global circuit in 1920.

Mechanism

Lightning 

Lightning strikes the earth 40,000 times per day, and can be thought to charge the earth like a battery. Thunderstorms generate an electrical potential difference between the earth's surface and the ionosphere, mainly by means of lightning returning current to ground. Because of this, the ionosphere is positively charged relative to the earth.
Consequently, there is always a small current of approximately 2pA per square metre transporting charged particles in the form of atmospheric ions between the ionosphere and the surface.

Fair weather
This current is carried by ions present in the atmosphere (generated mainly by cosmic rays in the free troposphere and above, and by radioactivity in the lowest 1km or so).
The ions make the air weakly conductive; different locations, and meteorological conditions have different electrical conductivity. Fair weather describes the atmosphere away from thunderstorms where this weak electrical current between the ionosphere and the earth flows.

Measurement 
The voltages involved in the Earth's circuit are significant. At sea level, the typical potential gradient in fair weather is 120 V/m. Nonetheless, since the conductivity of air is limited, the associated currents are also limited. A typical value is 1800 A over the entire planet.
When it is not rainy or stormy, the amount of electricity within the atmosphere is typically between 1000 and 1800 amps. In fair weather, there are about 3.5 microamps per square kilometer (9 microamps per square mile). This can produce a 200+ volt difference between the head and feet of a regular person.

Carnegie curve 
The Earth's electrical current varies according to a daily pattern called the Carnegie curve, caused by the regular daily variations in atmospheric electrification associated with the earth's stormy regions. The pattern also shows seasonal variation, linked to the earth's solstices and equinoxes. It was named after the Carnegie Institution for Science.

See also
 Atmospheric electricity
 Geophysics
 Earth's magnetic field 
 Sprites and lightning
 Space charge
 Telluric currents

External sources

Publications

 Le Monnier, L.-G.: "Observations sur l'Electricité de l'Air", Histoire de l'Académie royale des sciences (1752), pp. 233ff. 1752.
 Sven Israelsson, On the Conception Fair Weather Condition in Atmospheric Electricity. 1977.
 Ogawa, T., "Fair-weather electricity". J. Geophys. Res., 90, 5951–5960, 1985.
 Wåhlin, L., "Elements of fair weather electricity". J. Geophys. Res., 99, 10767-10772, 1994
 RB Bent, WCA Hutchinson, Electric space charge measurements and the electrode effect within the height of a 21 m mast. J. Atmos. Terr. Phys, 196.
 Bespalov P.A., Chugunov Yu. V. and Davydenko S.S., Planetary electric generator under fair-weather condition with altitude-dependent atmospheric conductivity, Journal of Atmospheric and Terrestrial Physics, v.58, #5,pp. 605–611,1996
 DG Yerg, KR Johnson, Short-period fluctuations in the fair weather electric field. J. Geophys. Res., 1974.
 T Ogawa, Diurnal variation in atmospheric electricity. J. Geomag. Geoelect, 1960.
 R Reiter, Relationships Between Atmospheric Electric Phenomena and Simultaneous Meteorological Conditions. 1960
 J. Law, The ionisation of the atmosphere near the ground in fair weather. Quarterly Journal of the Royal Meteorological Society, 1963
 T. Marshall, W.D. Rust, M. Stolzenburg, W. Roeder, P. Krehbim A study of enhanced fair-weather electric fields occurring soon after sunrise.
 R Markson, Modulation of the earth's electric field by cosmic radiation. Nature, 1981
 Clark, John Fulmer, The Fair Weather Atmospheric Electric Potential and its Gradient.
 P. A. Bespalov, Yu. V. Chugunov and S. S. Davydenko, Planetary electric generator under fair-weather conditions with altitude-dependent atmospheric conductivity.
 AM Selva, et al., A New Mechanism for the Maintenance of Fair Weather Electric Field and Cloud Electrification.
 M. J. Rycroft, S. Israelssonb and C. Pricec, The global atmospheric electric circuit, solar activity and climate change.
 A. Mary Selvam, A. S. Ramachandra Murty, G. K. Manohar, S. S. Kandalgaonkar, Bh. V.Ramana Murty, A New Mechanism for the Maintenance of Fair Weather Electric Field and Cloud Electrification. arXiv:physics/9910006
 Ogawa, Toshio, Fair-Weather electricity. Journal of Geophysical Research, Volume 90, Issue D4, pp. 5951–5960.
 An auroral effect on the fair weather electric field. Nature 278, 239–241 (15 March 1979); 
 Bespalov, P. A.; Chugunov, Yu. V., Plasmasphere rotation and origin of atmospheric electricity. Physics – Doklady, Volume 39, Issue 8, August 1994, pp. 553–555
 Bespalov, P. A.; Chugunov, Yu. V.; Davydenko, S. S. Planetary electric generator under fair-weather conditions with altitude-dependent atmospheric conductivity. Journal of Atmospheric and Terrestrial Physics.
 A.J. Bennett, R.G. Harrison, A simple atmospheric electrical instrument for educational use

References

External links

Atmospheric electricity